The University of Wisconsin–Milwaukee at Waukesha is a two-year college located in Waukesha, in the U.S. state of Wisconsin. A campus of the University of Wisconsin Colleges, it is part of the University of Wisconsin System. Like the other UW Colleges' campuses, UW-Waukesha's land and buildings belong to a local government unit, in this case Waukesha County. As part of the local-state partnership, the University of Wisconsin provides faculty, staff, educational programs, technology, furnishings, libraries, and supplies. In 2018, the college became a regional campus of the University of Wisconsin-Milwaukee

History 
Waukesha County purchased the  campus from William J. and Blanche Hughes, in March 1965. The first buildings on the campus were erected in 1966 on an 86-acre site near the geographic center of Waukesha County. The first classes met in fall 1966 at Mt. St. Paul Seminary because the new buildings were not ready for occupancy. In December 1966 the campus opened in its current location, beginning with Northview Hall, the Field House, and the Commons. Southview Hall opened in February 1969, and both the Administration Building and an extension to Northview Hall, were added in 1978. The Fine Arts Center, with its 337-seat Lunt-Fontanne Theatre, came in 1987. In 1992, a computer center, and a new entryway to Northview Hall added  to buildings on the campus.

In celebration of the campus's 30th anniversary, the Student Commons was completely remodeled and Westview Hall was added. Dedicated on September 8, 1996, the $5.7 million project added  to the Commons and renovated an existing . Along with expanded space for the student lounge, student activities, student services and study center offices, a dining area and re-located bookstore were added.

In 2001, a new gym floor was installed in the Field House, and the building was remodeled and expanded to include three classrooms and a fitness center, adding .

The former farm land is being restored to native prairie and woods, and it harbors the UW System's only large wood-fired kiln, and as well as a smaller one. In 2001 a  classroom building was constructed on the site. The Gertrude Sherman Building includes one general classroom and one devoted to art. The Wildlife in Need Center moved its headquarters to the field station site in 2011.

Students, through their segregated fee, support services to students such as day-care reimbursement, and a peer tutoring program, managed by the Academic Success Center.

Campus 
UW-Waukesha's land and buildings belong to Waukesha County, which purchased the  land from William J. Hughes and his wife, Blanche I. Fischer Hughes, in March 1965. As part of a local-state partnership, the University of Wisconsin provides faculty, staff, educational programs, technology, furnishings, libraries, and supplies.

Student profile
About 2,000 students attend each fall and spring semester and another 1,000 take summer classes. Many community residents are involved in the campus non-credit classes offered through Continuing Education.

Enrollment for fall 2013 
 Headcount:  2,155 credit; FTE 1,569 credit; 2,907 non-credit
 Full-time: 47%
 Part-time: 53%
 Female:47%
 Male: 53%
 Ethnic minority: 9%
 Receiving financial aid: 43%

Curriculum 
UW-Waukesha's curriculum covers the three broad areas of humanities, natural and mathematical sciences, and social sciences. The school offers a Bachelor of Arts and Sciences  but many students go on to receive their bachelor's degree at other institutions.

Extracurricular activities 
Students can participate in a variety of co-curricular activities ranging from athletics and intramural sports to the student newspaper, The Observer. Student clubs range from drama, ecology, literary to philosophy. In addition, the Student Activities Committee (ACT) plans noon-time entertainment, movie/video nights, fall fest, and spring fling. Student Government (SGA) is the official representative and legislative body for all students.

Notable faculty
Edward Jackamonis, speaker of the Wisconsin State Assembly
Neal Nelson, Hall of Fame coach.

References

External links
University of Wisconsin–Waukesha

University of Wisconsin-Milwaukee at Waukesha
Waukesha, Wisconsin
Schools in Waukesha County, Wisconsin
Educational institutions established in 1968
1968 establishments in Wisconsin
Two-year colleges in the United States
Waukesha
Waukesha